The 1986 Maghreb Athletics Championships was the tenth edition of the international athletics competition between the countries of the Maghreb. Morocco, Algeria and Tunisia were the competing nations. Organised by the Union des Fédérations d'Athlétisme du Maghreb Uni (Union of Athletics Federations of the United Maghreb), it took place in Tunis, Tunisia from 7–9 August. A total of 39 athletics events were contested, 23 for men and 16 for women. The Maghreb men's marathon was held for the third and final time at the tournament.

Algeria topped the table, winning more than half the events on offer. Tunisia was the runner-up with eleven gold medals. The competition was affected by strong winds and many of the marks in the sprints and horizontal jumps were wind-assisted. The men's 10,000 metres race was not timed to international standards.

Medal summary

Men

Women

References

Champions
Les championnats maghrebins d athletisme. Union Sportive Oudja. Retrieved on 2015-02-20.

Maghreb Athletics Championships
International athletics competitions hosted by Tunisia
Sport in Tunis
Maghreb Athletics Championships
Maghreb Athletics Championships
20th century in Tunis